The Hessian Renegades is a 1909 American silent war film directed by D. W. Griffith. It is set during the American Revolution.

Plot
A young soldier during the American Revolution has the mission to carry a crucial message to General Washington but he is spotted by a group of enemy soldiers called Hessians. He finds refuge with a family, but his enemies soon discover him. After that, the family and neighbors must plan a way to send the important message.

Cast

 Owen Moore as American Soldier
 Linda Arvidson as Farmer
 Kate Bruce as Soldier's Family
 William J. Butler as Farmer
 Verner Clarges as Farmer
 D. W. Griffith
 Robert Harron as Farmer
 Arthur V. Johnson as Hessian
 James Kirkwood as Soldier's Family
 Florence Lawrence
 Marion Leonard
 Wilfred Lucas
 George Nichols as Hessian
 Anthony O'Sullivan as Hessian
 Lottie Pickford
 Mary Pickford as Soldier's Family
 Frank Powell as Hessian
 Billy Quirk as Hessian
 Gertrude Robinson as Soldier's Family
 Mack Sennett as Hessian
 George Siegmann as Hessian
 Henry B. Walthall

See also
 1909 in film
 D. W. Griffith filmography
 List of films about the American Revolution
 List of television series and miniseries about the American Revolution

References

External links
 
 

1909 films
1909 short films
1900s war drama films
American black-and-white films
American silent short films
American war drama films
Articles containing video clips
Biograph Company films
Films directed by D. W. Griffith
Films with screenplays by Frank E. Woods
Silent war drama films
1900s American films
Silent American drama films